The Sandlot: Heading Home (also known as The Sandlot 3 or The Sandlot 3: Heading Home), is a 2007 American science fiction sports comedy film directed by William Dear and starring Luke Perry, Danny Nucci and Sarah Deakins. It is the second sequel to The Sandlot (1993), with the other one being The Sandlot 2 (2005). It was released direct-to-video on May 1, 2007.

Plot
In 2004, successful, but arrogant, baseball superstar Tommy "Santa" Santorelli of the Los Angeles Dodgers is knocked unconscious by a wild pitch after being blinded by a mistakenly launched fireworks display. Tommy wakes up twenty-eight years in the past as his 13-year-old self in 1976. When Tommy attempts to explain his time travel to his mother Sara, she takes him to the doctor, with whom he quarrels. After Tommy leaves the office, the doctor and Sara discuss her being diagnosed with cancer.

Eventually, his mother sends him to play baseball with his friends Two-Ton, Ryan, Q, D.P., Wings, Timber, Wok, and Roll who all play on the sandlot baseball team. The next day, Tommy tells his story to teammate Ryan, and later protects him from local bully E.J. Needman, whose father, Earl, is planning to build condominiums on the Sandlot. After seeing the disrespectful attitude of E.J., Tommy decides to join the Sandlot team to put him in his place. Tommy instructs his teammates with the help of Benny and Squints, thereby winning several games. Needman proposes a baseball game to determine the fate of the Sandlot. Tommy joins Needman's team, but ultimately returns to that of his friends, and wins the game for them, saving the Sandlot. After the game, Tommy rushes home to Sara, who is growing weaker, telling her that he won. She tells Tommy she is proud of him. Outside, Ryan throws the game ball to Tommy claiming everyone wanted him to have it, he throws it knocking Tommy out and returning him to the present.

Upon his return to the present, he wakes up in the hospital being treated by Q who has become a doctor, and learns that instead of becoming an arrogant and disloyal player, he has remained loyal to the Dodgers his entire career. He has also married his girlfriend, Judy, and they have two children named Heather and Oliver. The biggest difference of all is that he stayed in communication with his old friends ever since this victory. Tommy then speaks to his mother's spirit, proud of who he has now become.

Cast

 Danny Nucci as Benny Rodriguez, the sandlot team's coach and a member of the original sandlot team. Nucci replaces Mike Vitar from the original.
 Luke Perry as Tommy Santorelli, the main character, a successful but arrogant baseball player.
 Keanu Pires as Tommy's 13-year-old self
 Sarah Deakins as Sara Santorelli, Tommy's single mother.
 Cainan Wiebe as Ryan, a younger member and left fielder of the sandlot team who is silent after the death of his father.
 Dean Hinchey as (Adult) Ryan
 Alexander Ludwig as Earl "E.J." Needman Jr., a local bully and Tommy's rival who faces constant pressure from his father.
 Brandon Olds as Two-Ton, a husky outfielder.
 Meshach Peters as Quincy "Q" Washington, a younger member of the sandlot team who is the most intelligent on medical procedures.
 Chris Shields as (Adult) Dr. Quincy Washington
 Kai James as Timber, the pitcher for the Sandlot team. At first unable to pitch to batters, he finds confidence under Benny and Tommy's tutelage. 
 Ryan Drescher as Wings McKay, a speedy third baseman.
 Cole Heppell as D.P., the catcher for the Sandlot team. Known to hackle his opponents. 
 Renzo Carbonel as Rolando "Roll" Alvarez, first baseman
 Samuel Patrick Chu as Matt "Wok" Wakamoto, second baseman
 Chauncey Leopardi as Michael "Squints" Palledorous, a member of the original sandlot team. Leopardi reprises his role from the original film.
 Chris Gauthier as Officer Pork Chop, Two-Ton's uncle.
 Paul Jarrett as Earl Needman, E.J.'s father.
 Leila Johnson as Judy Santorelli, Tommy's ex-fiancé turned wife.

Reception
Heather Boerner of Common Sense Media gave the film four out of five stars, writing: "If you mixed Back to the Future with A Christmas Carol and sprinkled in a liberal dose of baseball fandom, you'd end up with this sweet, fun baseball movie that entertains while it instructs".

References

External links
 The Sandlot: Heading Home Trailer at NewYorkTimes.com
 
 

2007 films
2007 direct-to-video films
2000s sports films
American baseball films
American coming-of-age films
American sequel films
Films directed by William Dear
20th Century Fox direct-to-video films
Direct-to-video sequel films
Films set in 1976
Films set in 2005
Films about time travel
2000s English-language films
2000s American films